Ee Lokam Evide Kure Manushyar is a 1985 Indian Malayalam-language film, directed by P. G. Vishwambharan and produced by Sajan. The film stars Mammooty, Rahman, Nedumudi Venu, Jayabharathi, Innocent and Thilakan in important roles. The film has musical score by Shyam.

The film has Bollywood actor Amjad Khan in a pivotal role.

Cast

Mammootty as Ummer
Rahman as Balu
Jayabharathi
Innocent as Ouseppu
Thilakan as Krishna Pillai
Nedumudi Venu
Rohini as Sheela 
Amjad Khan as Abbas
Kajal Kiran as Jameela
Lalu Alex as SI Sreedharan
Meena
Paravoor Bharathan
Philomina as Chantha Rosy
T. G. Ravi as Keshavan
Santhosh
James as James

Soundtrack
The music was composed by Shyam and the lyrics were written by P. Bhaskaran.

References

External links
 

1985 films
1980s Malayalam-language films
Films directed by P. G. Viswambharan